Aponchiidae is a family of nematodes belonging to the order Monhysterida.

Genera:
 Aponchium Cobb, 1920
 Metalaimoides
 Synonema Cobb, 1920

References

Nematodes